Anthony Crockett (1754 – 1838) was an American soldier during the American Revolutionary War, the Northwest Indian War, and the War of 1812. He also served as a Kentucky politician.

Early life
Anthony Crockett was born in Prince Edward County, Virginia on November 19, 1754, to William Crockett.

His parents died when he was around 10 years old. He then lived with his relative, Samuel Crockett, in Botetourt County, Virginia until 1776.

Career
In February 1776, Crockett enlisted with Captain Thomas Posey's company of the 7th Virginia Regiment. He served with the 7th from 1776 to 1778, and fought at the Battles of Saratoga and Brandywine. At Saratoga, he gave aid to a wounded General Lafayette. From 1778 to the end of the war, he was a First Lieutenant in the Illinois Regiment of Virginia under George Rogers Clark. He also served with his cousin, Colonel Joseph Crockett. He fought with the regiment in the Battles of Blue Licks, Piqua and Chillicothe. From 1782 to 1794, he was a soldier in the Northwest Indian War.

After his military career, he moved to Mercer County, Kentucky and served in the Virginia General Assembly in 1790. After, he moved to Franklin County, Kentucky and served as its representative from 1796 to 1799 in the Kentucky House of Representatives. He also served as the Sergeant-at-Arms of the Kentucky Senate for thirty years.

In his 50s, he served in the War of 1812 under his friend Governor Isaac Shelby as a Brigade Major. Shelby sent Crockett, as an "old Revolutionary soldier of great courage", to Fort Meigs after the Second Siege of Fort Meigs to persuade the troops to remain for sixty more days of service. The battle worn troops could not be persuaded, which pushed Shelby to issue a proclamation on July 13, 1813, for new volunteers.

In 1824, Colonel Crockett and his cousin, Colonel Joseph Crockett, entertained General Lafayette in Kentucky during his 1824-1825 visit to America.

Personal life
Crockett took a leave of absence in 1780 and married Mary Margaret Robertson (1760-1818) of Virginia. Together, they had eleven children, six sons and five daughters:
 Dandridge Spottswood Crockett
 Elizabeth Crockett
 Fontaine Posey Crockett (1797-1837) – soldier at the Battle of New Orleans
 Granville Smith Crockett (1784/1799-1838) – soldier at the Battle of New Orleans, sheriff of Rutherford County, Tennessee, clerk, militiaman, representative of Rutherford County in the 21st Tennessee General Assembly (1835-1837)
 Katherine G. Crockett
 Martha Dillon Crockett
 Mary "Polly" Crockett (1781-1856) – married William B. Hawkins
 Overton Washington Crockett (1791-1864) – soldier at the Battle of New Orleans
 Samuel B. Crockett
 Sarah Crockett
 William R. Crockett

Death
He died on December 5, 1838, in Frankfort, Kentucky. His death was announced on the Kentucky Senate floor on December 7, 1838. He was buried at Benson Churchyard in Franklin County. He was re-interred to a lot dedicated to Revolutionary soldiers at the Frankfort Cemetery in Frankfort, Kentucky on July 4, 1916.

References

1754 births
1838 deaths
People from Prince Edward County, Virginia
Virginia militiamen in the American Revolution
18th-century United States Army personnel
American people of the Northwest Indian War
People from Virginia in the War of 1812
Members of the Kentucky House of Representatives
18th-century American politicians
Burials at Frankfort Cemetery